Proinsias De Rossa (born 15 May 1940) is a former Irish Labour Party politician who served as Minister for Social Welfare from 1994 to 1997, Leader of Democratic Left from 1992 to 1999 and Leader of the Workers' Party from 1988 to 1992. He served as Member of the European Parliament (MEP) for the Dublin constituency from 1989 to 1992 and 1999 to 2012. He was a Teachta Dála (TD) for the Dublin North-West constituency from 1989 to 2002.

Early life and political activity
Born as Francis Ross in 1940 in Dublin, he was educated at Marlborough Street National School and Dublin Institute of Technology. He joined Fianna Éireann at age 12.

Soon after his sixteenth birthday, in May 1956, he joined the Irish Republican Army (IRA), and was politically active in Sinn Féin from an early age. During the IRA Border Campaign, he was arrested while training other IRA members in Glencree in May 1957. He served seven months in Mountjoy Prison and was then interned at the Curragh Camp.

Political activities and career
He took the Official Sinn Féin side in the 1970 split. In 1977, he contested his first general election for the party, which that year was renamed Sinn Féin – The Workers' Party (in 1982 the name changed again to the Workers' Party).

He was successful on his third attempt, and was elected at the February 1982 general election as a Sinn Féin – The Workers' Party TD for the Dublin North-West constituency. He retained his seat until the 2002 general election when he stood down in order to devote more time to his work in the European Parliament.

In 1988, De Rossa succeeded Tomás Mac Giolla as president of the Workers' Party. The party had been growing steadily in the 1980s, and had its best-ever electoral performance in the general and European elections held in 1989. The party won 7 Dáil seats with 5% of the vote. De Rossa himself was elected to the European Parliament for the Dublin constituency, where he topped the poll and the party almost succeeded in replacing Fine Gael as the capital's second-largest party. He sat as a member of the Group for the European United Left. However, the campaign resulted in a serious build-up of financial debt by the Workers' Party, which threatened to greatly inhibit the party's ability to ensure it would hold on to its gains.

Long-standing tensions within the Workers' Party, pitting reformers, including most of the party's TDs, against hard-liners centred on former general secretary Seán Garland, came to a head in 1992. Disagreements on policy issues were exacerbated by the desire of the reformers to ditch the democratic centralist nature of the party structures, and to remove any remaining questions about alleged party links with the Official IRA, a topic which had been the subject of persistent and embarrassing media coverage. De Rossa called a Special Ardfheis (party conference) to debate changes to the constitution. The motion failed to get the required two-thirds majority, and subsequently De Rossa led the majority of the parliamentary group and councillors out of a meeting of the party's Central Executive Committee the following Saturday at Wynn's Hotel, splitting the party.

De Rossa and the other former Workers' Party members then established a new political party, provisionally called New Agenda. At its founding conference in March 1992, it was named Democratic Left and De Rossa was elected party leader. Later that year he resigned his European Parliament seat, where he was succeeded by Democratic Left general secretary Des Geraghty.

Following the collapse of the Fianna Fáil–Labour Party coalition government in 1994, Fine Gael, Labour and Democratic Left negotiated a government programme for the remaining life of the 27th Dáil, which became known as the Rainbow Coalition. De Rossa became Minister for Social Welfare. He initiated Ireland's first national anti-poverty strategy, a commission on the family, and a commission to examine national pension policy.

The 1997 general election resulted in the defeat of the outgoing coalition. At this point, Democratic Left had accumulated a very significant financial debt. In light of the co-operation achieved in practically all policy areas during the Rainbow Coalition, the party decided to merge with the Labour Party. Labour leader Ruairi Quinn became leader of the unified party; De Rossa took up the symbolic post of party president, which he held until 2002.

In 1999, De Rossa was elected again at the European Parliament election for the Dublin constituency, sitting on this occasion with the Group of the Party of European Socialists. De Rossa did not contest his Dáil seat at the 2002 general election. He was re-elected at the 2004 European Parliament election. As a member of the European Parliament, De Rossa took a strong pro-integration approach from a distinctly social democratic perspective, as well as a keen interest in foreign policy and social policy.

De Rossa was a member of the European Convention which produced the July 2003 draft European constitution. De Rossa was chair of the European Parliament's delegation for relations with the Palestinian Legislative Council. He was a member of the Committee on Employment and Social Affairs and the Conference of Delegation Chairs, and a substitute member of the Committee on Development and the delegation to the Euro-Mediterranean Parliamentary Assembly. On 16 January 2012, he announced his decision to resign as an MEP, and stepped down on 1 February.

Libel action
During De Rossa's period as leader of Democratic Left, Irish journalist Eamon Dunphy, writing in the Sunday Independent newspaper, published an article alleging that De Rossa was aware, while a member of the Workers' Party, of the Official IRA's alleged illegal activities, including bank robberies and forgery. De Rossa sued the newspaper for libel and was awarded IR£300,000.

Sources
The Politics of Illusion: A Political History of the IRA, Henry Patterson, 
The Workers' Party in Dáil Éireann: The First Ten Years, The Workers' Party, 1991
Patterns of Betrayal: The Flight From Socialism, The Workers' Party, 1992

References

External links
Proinsias De Rossa's page on the Labour Party website

1940 births
Living people
Alumni of Dublin Institute of Technology
Democratic Left (Ireland) TDs
Irish republicans interned without trial
Irish Republican Army (1922–1969) members
Labour Party (Ireland) MEPs
Labour Party (Ireland) TDs
Local councillors in Dublin (city)
Members of the 23rd Dáil
Members of the 24th Dáil
Members of the 25th Dáil
Members of the 26th Dáil
Members of the 27th Dáil
Members of the 28th Dáil
MEPs for the Republic of Ireland 1989–1994
MEPs for the Republic of Ireland 1999–2004
MEPs for the Republic of Ireland 2004–2009
MEPs for the Republic of Ireland 2009–2014
Ministers for Social Affairs (Ireland)
Workers' Party (Ireland) TDs